Quartzville  may refer to:
Quartzville, former name of Nashville, California
Quartzville Creek, in Oregon